In the Catholic Church, a member of the clergy who is created a cardinal is assigned a titular church in Rome, Italy. These are Catholic churches in the city, within the jurisdiction of the Diocese of Rome, that serve as honorary designations signifying the relationship between cardinals and the pope, the bishop of Rome. According to the Code of Canon Law, a cardinal may assist his titular church through counsel or patronage, although "he has no power of governance over it, and he should not for any reason interfere in matters concerning the administration of its good, or its discipline, or the service of the church".

There are two ranks of titular churches: titles and deaconries. A title is a titular church that is assigned to a cardinal priest, whereas a deaconry is normally assigned to a cardinal deacon. If a cardinal priest or a cardinal deacon is later made a cardinal bishop, he is typically transferred from his titular church and assigned the vacant title of a suburbicarian diocese in the vicinity of Rome. Patriarchs of Eastern Catholic Churches who are created cardinal bishops are assigned neither titular churches nor titles of suburbicarian dioceses.

A cardinal may request that he be transferred to another titular church in a consistory; in addition, when a cardinal deacon opts to become a cardinal priest (usually after ten years), he may request either that his deaconry be elevated pro hac vice ('for this occasion') to a title or that he be transferred from his deaconry to a vacant title. Occasionally, a titular church may be retained in commendam ('in trust') by a cardinal who has been transferred to another titular church or a suburbicarian diocese.

 there are 237 extant titular churches, 168 of which are titles and 69 of which are deaconries, and 7 suburbicarian dioceses. Currently, 21 titular churches (11 titles and 10 deaconries) and one title of a suburbicarian diocese are vacant. The tables below also indicate the 58 titular churches (45 titles and 13 deaconries) that are designated as basilicas.

Location key 

Locations within the city include a one-letter abbreviation denoting the type of historical subdivision; as depicted in the map below, the subdivision types are largely arranged concentrically, outwards from the historic district to the rural outskirts of Rome, in the following order:

  (R.), plural 
  (Q.), plural 
  (S.), plural 
  (Z.), plural 

Locations for suburbicarian dioceses also include a two-letter abbreviation denoting either the Metropolitan City of Rome Capital (RM) or the Province of Rieti (RI), both of which are provinces of the Italian region of Lazio.

Titles 
 there are 168 titles, 11 of which are vacant.

{| class="wikitable sortable"
|-
! scope="col" | Title
! scope="col" | Location
! scope="col" | Cardinal
! scope="col" | Since
! scope="col" class="unsortable" | 

|- id="Sant'Agnese fuori le mura"
| scope="row" data-sort-value="Agnese fuori le mura" | Sant'Agnese fuori le mura (basilica)
| data-sort-value="Trieste" | 
| data-sort-value="Ruini, Camillo" | Camillo Ruini
| 
| style="text-align:center" | 

|- id="Sant'Agostino"
| scope="row" data-sort-value="Agostino" | Sant'Agostino (basilica)
| data-sort-value="Sant'Eustachio" | 
| data-sort-value="Ricard, Jean-Pierre" | Jean-Pierre Ricard
| 
| style="text-align:center" | 

|- id="Sant'Alberto Magno"
| scope="row" data-sort-value="Alberto Magno" | Sant'Alberto Magno
| data-sort-value="Castel Giubileo" | 
| data-sort-value="do Carmo da Silva, Virgilio" | Virgilio do Carmo da Silva 
| 
| style="text-align:center" | 

|- id="Santi Ambrogio e Carlo" style="background:#ccc"
| scope="row" data-sort-value="Ambrogio e Carlo" | Santi Ambrogio e Carlo (basilica) 
| data-sort-value="Campo Marzio" | 
| data-sort-value="Vacant" | Vacant 
| 
| style="text-align:center" | 

|- id="Sant'Anastasia"
| scope="row" data-sort-value="Anastasia" | Sant'Anastasia (basilica)
| data-sort-value="Campitelli" | 
| data-sort-value="Dal Corso, Eugenio" | Eugenio Dal Corso 
| 
| style="text-align:center" | 

|- id="Sant'Andrea al Quirinale"
| scope="row" data-sort-value="Andrea al Quirinale" | Sant'Andrea al Quirinale
| data-sort-value="Monti" | 
| data-sort-value="Scherer, Odilo Pedro" | Odilo Pedro Scherer
| 
| style="text-align:center" | 

|- id="Sant'Andrea della Valle"
| scope="row" data-sort-value="Andrea della Valle" | Sant'Andrea della Valle (basilica)
| data-sort-value="Sant'Eustachio" | 
| data-sort-value="Nzapalainga, Dieudonne" | Dieudonné Nzapalainga 
| 
| style="text-align:center" | 

|- id="Sant'Andrea delle Fratte"
| scope="row" data-sort-value="Andrea delle Fratte" | Sant'Andrea delle Fratte (basilica)
| data-sort-value="Colonna" | 
| data-sort-value="Antonelli, Ennio" | Ennio Antonelli
| 
| style="text-align:center" | 

|- id="Santi Andrea e Gregorio al Monte Celio"
| scope="row" data-sort-value="Andrea e Gregorio al Monte Celio" | Santi Andrea e Gregorio al Monte Celio
| data-sort-value="Celio" | 
| data-sort-value="Montenegro, Francesco" | Francesco Montenegro
| 
| style="text-align:center" | 

|- id="Sant'Angela Merici"
| scope="row" data-sort-value="Angela Merici" | Sant'Angela Merici
| data-sort-value="Nomentano" | 
| data-sort-value="Tamkevicius, Sigitas" | Sigitas Tamkevičius 
| 
| style="text-align:center" | 

|- id="Sant'Antonio da Padova in Via Merulana" style="background:#ccc"
| scope="row" data-sort-value="Antonio da Padova in Via Merulana" | Sant'Antonio da Padova in Via Merulana (basilica) 
| data-sort-value="Esquilino" | 
| data-sort-value="Vacant" | Vacant 
| 
| style="text-align:center" | 

|- id="Sant'Antonio da Padova in Via Tuscolana"
| scope="row" data-sort-value="Antonio da Padova in Via Tuscolana" | Sant'Antonio da Padova in Via Tuscolana
| data-sort-value="Tuscolano" | 
| data-sort-value="Zerbo, Jean" | Jean Zerbo
| 
| style="text-align:center" | 

|- id="Sant'Antonio in Campo Marzio"
| scope="row" data-sort-value="Antonio in Campo Marzio" | Sant'Antonio in Campo Marzio
| data-sort-value="Campo Marzio" | 
| data-sort-value="Macario do Nascimento Clemente, Manuel Jose" | Manuel José Macário do Nascimento Clemente
| 
| style="text-align:center" | 

|- id="Santi Aquila e Priscilla"
| scope="row" data-sort-value="Aquila e Priscilla" | Santi Aquila e Priscilla
| data-sort-value="Portuense" | 
| data-sort-value="Garcia Rodriguez, Juan de la Caridad" | Juan de la Caridad García Rodríguez
| 
| style="text-align:center" | 

|- id="Sant'Atanasio"
| scope="row" data-sort-value="Atanasio" | Sant'Atanasio
| data-sort-value="Campo Marzio" | 
| data-sort-value="Muresan, Lucian" | Lucian Mureșan
| 
| style="text-align:center" | 

|- id="Sant'Atanasio a Via Tiburtina"
| scope="row" data-sort-value="Atanasio a Via Tiburtina" | Sant'Atanasio a Via Tiburtina
| data-sort-value="Pietralata" | 
| data-sort-value="Zubeir Wako, Gabriel" | Gabriel Zubeir Wako
| 
| style="text-align:center" | 

|- id="Santa Balbina"
| scope="row" data-sort-value="Balbina" | Santa Balbina (basilica)
| data-sort-value="San Saba" | 
| data-sort-value="Erdo, Peter" | Péter Erdő
| 
| style="text-align:center" | 

|- id="San Bartolomeo all'Isola"
| scope="row" data-sort-value="Bartolomeo all'Isola" | San Bartolomeo all'Isola (basilica)
| data-sort-value="Ripa" | 
| data-sort-value="Cupich, Blase Joseph" | Blase Joseph Cupich
| 
| style="text-align:center" | 

|- id="Beata Maria Vergine Addolorata a piazza Buenos Aires"
| scope="row" data-sort-value="Beata Maria Vergine Addolorata a piazza Buenos Aires" | Beata Maria Vergine Addolorata a piazza Buenos Aires
| data-sort-value="Trieste" | 
| data-sort-value="Karlic, Estanislao Esteban" | Estanislao Esteban Karlic
| 
| style="text-align:center" | 

|- id="Beata Vergine Maria del Monte Carmelo a Mostacciano"
| scope="row" data-sort-value="Beata Vergine Maria del Monte Carmelo a Mostacciano" | Beata Vergine Maria del Monte Carmelo a Mostacciano
| data-sort-value="Torrino" | 
| data-sort-value="Okogie, Anthony Olubunmi" | Anthony Olubunmi Okogie
| 
| style="text-align:center" | 

|- id="San Bernardo alle Terme"
| scope="row" data-sort-value="Bernardo alle Terme" | San Bernardo alle Terme
| data-sort-value="Castro Pretorio" | 
| data-sort-value="Alencherry, George" | George Alencherry
| 
| style="text-align:center" | 

|- id="San Bonaventura da Bagnoregio"
| scope="row" data-sort-value="Bonaventura da Bagnoregio" | San Bonaventura da Bagnoregio
| data-sort-value="Don Bosco" | 
| data-sort-value="Coutts, Joseph" | Joseph Coutts
| 
| style="text-align:center" | 

|- id="Santi Bonifacio ed Alessio"
| scope="row" data-sort-value="Bonifacio ed Alessio" | Santi Bonifacio ed Alessio (basilica)
| data-sort-value="Ripa" | 
| data-sort-value="Costa, Paulo Cezar" | Paulo Cezar Costa
| 
| style="text-align:center" | 

|- id="San Callisto"
| scope="row" data-sort-value="Callisto" | San Callisto
| data-sort-value="Trastevere" | 
| data-sort-value="Eijk, Willem Jacobus" | Willem Jacobus Eijk
| 
| style="text-align:center" | 

|- id="San Camillo de Lellis"
| scope="row" data-sort-value="Camillo de Lellis" | San Camillo de Lellis (basilica)
| data-sort-value="Sallustiano" | 
| data-sort-value="Cipriani Thorne, Juan Luis" | Juan Luis Cipriani Thorne
| 
| style="text-align:center" | 

|- id="Santa Cecilia"
| scope="row" data-sort-value="Cecilia" | Santa Cecilia (basilica)
| data-sort-value="Trastevere" | 
| data-sort-value="Bassetti, Gualtiero" | Gualtiero Bassetti
| 
| style="text-align:center" | 

|- id="Santa Chiara a Vigna Clara"
| scope="row" data-sort-value="Chiara a Vigna Clara" | Santa Chiara a Vigna Clara
| data-sort-value="Della Vittoria" | 
| data-sort-value="Puljic, Vinko" | Vinko Puljić
| 
| style="text-align:center" | 

|- id="San Clemente"
| scope="row" data-sort-value="Clemente" | San Clemente (basilica)
| data-sort-value="Monti" | 
| data-sort-value="Miglio, Arrigo" | Arrigo Miglio
| 
| style="text-align:center" | 

|- id="San Corbiniano"
| scope="row" data-sort-value="Corbiniano" | San Corbiniano
| data-sort-value="Castel Fusano" | 
| data-sort-value="Marx, Reinhard" | Reinhard Marx
| 
| style="text-align:center" | 

|- id="San Crisogono"
| scope="row" data-sort-value="Crisogono" | San Crisogono (basilica)
| data-sort-value="Trastevere" | 
| data-sort-value="Yeom, Andrew, Soo-jung" | Andrew Yeom Soo-jung
| 
| style="text-align:center" | 

|- id="Santa Croce in Gerusalemme"
| scope="row" data-sort-value="Croce in Gerusalemme" | Santa Croce in Gerusalemme (basilica)
| data-sort-value="Esquilino" | 
| data-sort-value="Omella Omella, Juan Jose" | Juan José Omella Omella
| 
| style="text-align:center" | 

|- id="Santa Croce in Via Flaminia"
| scope="row" data-sort-value="Croce in Via Flaminia" | Santa Croce in Via Flaminia (basilica)
| data-sort-value="Flaminio" | 
| data-sort-value="da Rocha, Sergio" | Sérgio da Rocha
| 
| style="text-align:center" | 

|- id="Sacro Cuore di Gesù agonizzante a Vitinia"
| scope="row" data-sort-value="Cuore di Gesu agonizzante a Vitinia" | Sacro Cuore di Gesù agonizzante a Vitinia
| data-sort-value="Mezzocammino" | 
| data-sort-value="Toppo, Telesphore Placidus" | Telesphore Placidus Toppo
| 
| style="text-align:center" | 

|- id="Sacro Cuore di Maria"
| scope="row" data-sort-value="Cuore di Maria" | Sacro Cuore di Maria (basilica)
| data-sort-value="Pinciano" | 
| data-sort-value="Darmaatmadja, Julius Riyadi" | Julius Riyadi Darmaatmadja 
| 
| style="text-align:center" | 

|- id="Sacri Cuori di Gesù e Maria a Tor Fiorenza"
| scope="row" data-sort-value="Cuori di Gesu e Maria a Tor Fiorenza" | Sacri Cuori di Gesù e Maria a Tor Fiorenza
| data-sort-value="Trieste" | 
| data-sort-value="Menichelli, Edoardo" | Edoardo Menichelli
| 
| style="text-align:center" | 

|- id="Santi XII Apostoli"
| scope="row" data-sort-value="Dodici Apostoli" | Santi XII Apostoli (basilica)
| data-sort-value="Trevi" | 
| data-sort-value="Scola, Angelo" | Angelo Scola
| 
| style="text-align:center" | 

|- id="Santa Dorotea"
| scope="row" data-sort-value="Dorotea" | Santa Dorotea
| data-sort-value="Trastevere" | 
| data-sort-value="Jimenez Carvajal, Jorge Enrique" | Jorge Enrique Jiménez Carvajal 
| 
| style="text-align:center" | 

|- id="Sant'Egidio"
| scope="row" data-sort-value="Egidio" | Sant'Egidio
| data-sort-value="Trastevere" | 
| data-sort-value="Zuppi, Matteo Maria" | Matteo Maria Zuppi
| 
| style="text-align:center" | 

|- id="Sant'Emerenziana a Tor Fiorenza"
| scope="row" data-sort-value="Emerenziana a Tor Fiorenza" | Sant'Emerenziana a Tor Fiorenza
| data-sort-value="Trieste" | 
| data-sort-value="Kutwa, Jean-Pierre" | Jean-Pierre Kutwa
| 
| style="text-align:center" | 

|- id="Sant'Eusebio"
| scope="row" data-sort-value="Eusebio" | Sant'Eusebio
| data-sort-value="Esquilino" | 
| data-sort-value="DiNardo, Daniel Nicholas" | Daniel Nicholas DiNardo
| 
| style="text-align:center" | 

|- id="Santi Fabiano e Venanzio a Villa Fiorelli"
| scope="row" data-sort-value="Fabiano e Venanzio a Villa Fiorelli" | Santi Fabiano e Venanzio a Villa Fiorelli
| data-sort-value="Tuscolano" | 
| data-sort-value="Aguiar Retes, Carlos" | Carlos Aguiar Retes
| 
| style="text-align:center" | 

|- id="San Felice da Cantalice a Centocelle"
| scope="row" data-sort-value="Felice da Cantalice a Centocelle" | San Felice da Cantalice a Centocelle, suburbicarian rank 
| data-sort-value="Prenestino-Centocelle" | 
| data-sort-value="Tagle, Luis Antonio Gokim" | Luis Antonio Gokim Tagle
| 
| style="text-align:center" | 

|- id="San Francesco d'Assisi a Ripa Grande"
| scope="row" data-sort-value="Francesco d'Assisi a Ripa Grande" | San Francesco d'Assisi a Ripa Grande
| data-sort-value="Trastevere" | 
| data-sort-value="Rivera Carrera, Norberto" | Norberto Rivera Carrera
| 
| style="text-align:center" | 

|- id="San Francesco d'Assisi ad Acilia"
| scope="row" data-sort-value="Francesco d'Assisi ad Acilia" | San Francesco d'Assisi ad Acilia
| data-sort-value="Acilia Nord" | 
| data-sort-value="Napier, Wilfrid Fox" | Wilfrid Fox Napier 
| 
| style="text-align:center" | 

|- id="San Frumenzio ai Prati Fiscali"
| scope="row" data-sort-value="Frumenzio ai Prati Fiscali" | San Frumenzio ai Prati Fiscali
| data-sort-value="Val Melaina" | 
| data-sort-value="McElroy, Robert Walter" | Robert Walter McElroy
| 
| style="text-align:center" | 

|- id="San Gabriele Arcangelo all'Acqua Traversa"
| scope="row" data-sort-value="Gabriele Arcangelo all'Acqua Traversa" | San Gabriele Arcangelo all'Acqua Traversa
| data-sort-value="Della Vittoria" | 
| data-sort-value="Ambongo Besungu, Fridolin" | Fridolin Ambongo Besungu 
| 
| style="text-align:center" | 

|- id="San Gabriele dell'Addolorata"
| scope="row" data-sort-value="Gabriele dell'Addolorata" | San Gabriele dell'Addolorata
| data-sort-value="Don Bosco" | 
| data-sort-value="Duarte Langa, Julio" | Júlio Duarte Langa
| 
| style="text-align:center" | 

|- id="Santa Galla"
| scope="row" data-sort-value="Galla" | Santa Galla
| data-sort-value="Ostiense" | 
| data-sort-value="Sturla Berhouet, Daniel Fernando" | Daniel Fernando Sturla Berhouet 
| 
| style="text-align:center" | 

|- id="San Gerardo Maiella"
| scope="row" data-sort-value="Gerardo Maiella" | San Gerardo Maiella
| data-sort-value="Prenestino-Labicano" | 
| data-sort-value="Salazar Gomez, Ruben" | Rubén Salazar Gómez
| 
| style="text-align:center" | 

|- id="Gesù Divin Lavoratore"
| scope="row" data-sort-value="Gesu Divin Lavoratore" | Gesù Divin Lavoratore
| data-sort-value="Portuense" | 
| data-sort-value="Schonborn, Christoph" | Christoph Schönborn 
| 
| style="text-align:center" | 

|- id="Gesù Divin Maestro alla Pineta Sacchetti"
| scope="row" data-sort-value="Gesu Divin Maestro alla Pineta Sacchetti" | Gesù Divin Maestro alla Pineta Sacchetti
| data-sort-value="Trionfale" | 
| data-sort-value="Williams, Thomas Stafford" | Thomas Stafford Williams
| 
| style="text-align:center" | 

|- id="San Giacomo in Augusta"
| scope="row" data-sort-value="Giacomo in Augusta" | San Giacomo in Augusta
| data-sort-value="Campo Marzio" | 
| data-sort-value="Langlois, Chibly" | Chibly Langlois
| 
| style="text-align:center" | 

|- id="San Gioacchino ai Prati di Castello"
| scope="row" data-sort-value="Gioacchino ai Prati di Castello" | San Gioacchino ai Prati di Castello
| data-sort-value="Prati" | 
| data-sort-value="Brenes Solorzano, Leopoldo Jose" | Leopoldo José Brenes Solórzano
| 
| style="text-align:center" | 

|- id="Santi Gioacchino ad Anna al Tuscolano"
| scope="row" data-sort-value="Gioacchino ed Anna al Tuscolano" | Santi Gioacchino ed Anna al Tuscolano
| data-sort-value="Torre Maura" | 
| data-sort-value="Ticona Porco, Toribio" | Toribio Ticona Porco
| 
| style="text-align:center" | 

|- id="San Giovanni a Porta Latina"
| scope="row" data-sort-value="Giovanni a Porta Latina" | San Giovanni a Porta Latina
| data-sort-value="Celio" | 
| data-sort-value="Martinez Flores, Adalberto" | Adalberto Martínez Flores
| 
| style="text-align:center" | 

|- id="San Giovanni Battista de' Rossi"
| scope="row" data-sort-value="Giovanni Battista de' Rossi" | San Giovanni Battista de' Rossi
| data-sort-value="Appio-Latino" | 
| data-sort-value="Ribat, John" | John Ribat 
| 
| style="text-align:center" | 

|- id="San Giovanni Battista dei Fiorentini"
| scope="row" data-sort-value="Giovanni Battista dei Fiorentini" | San Giovanni Battista dei Fiorentini (basilica)
| data-sort-value="Ponte" | 
| data-sort-value="Petrocchi, Giuseppe" | Giuseppe Petrocchi
| 
| style="text-align:center" | 

|- id="San Giovanni Crisostomo a Monte Sacro Alto"
| scope="row" data-sort-value="Giovanni Crisostomo a Monte Sacro Alto" | San Giovanni Crisostomo a Monte Sacro Alto
| data-sort-value="Monte Sacro Alto" | 
| data-sort-value="Hollerich, Jean-Claude" | Jean-Claude Hollerich 
| 
| style="text-align:center" | 

|- id="Santi Giovanni e Paolo"
| scope="row" data-sort-value="Giovanni e Paolo" | Santi Giovanni e Paolo (basilica)
| data-sort-value="Celio" | 
| data-sort-value="De Kesel, Jozef" | Jozef De Kesel
| 
| style="text-align:center" | 

|- id="San Giovanni Evangelista a Spinaceto"
| scope="row" data-sort-value="Giovanni Evangelista a Spinaceto" | San Giovanni Evangelista a Spinaceto
| data-sort-value="Tor de' Cenci" | 
| data-sort-value="Ramazzini Imeri, Alvaro Leonel" | Álvaro Leonel Ramazzini Imeri
| 
| style="text-align:center" | 

|- id="Santi Giovanni Evangelista e Petronio"
| scope="row" data-sort-value="Giovanni Evangelista e Petronio" | Santi Giovanni Evangelista e Petronio
| data-sort-value="Regola" | 
| data-sort-value="Porras Cardozo, Baltazar Enrique" | Baltazar Enrique Porras Cardozo
| 
| style="text-align:center" | 

|- id="San Giovanni Maria Vianney"
| scope="row" data-sort-value="Giovanni Maria Vianney" | San Giovanni Maria Vianney
| data-sort-value="Borghesiana" | 
| data-sort-value="Woelki, Rainer Maria" | Rainer Maria Woelki
| 
| style="text-align:center" | 

|- id="San Girolamo a Corviale"
| scope="row" data-sort-value="Girolamo a Corviale" | San Girolamo a Corviale
| data-sort-value="Gianicolense" | 
| data-sort-value="Villalba, Luis Hector" | Luis Héctor Villalba
| 
| style="text-align:center" | 

|- id="San Girolamo dei Croati"
| scope="row" data-sort-value="Girolamo dei Croati" | San Girolamo dei Croati
| data-sort-value="Campo Marzio" | 
| data-sort-value="Bozanic, Josip" | Josip Bozanić
| 
| style="text-align:center" | 

|- id="San Giuda Taddeo Apostolo"
| scope="row" data-sort-value="Giuda Taddeo Apostolo" | San Giuda Taddeo Apostolo
| data-sort-value="Appio-Latino" | 
| data-sort-value="Marengo, Giorgio" | Giorgio Marengo 
| 
| style="text-align:center" | 

|- id="San Giuseppe all'Aurelio"
| scope="row" data-sort-value="Giuseppe all'Aurelio" | San Giuseppe all'Aurelio
| data-sort-value="Primavalle" | 
| data-sort-value="Lacroix, Gerald Cyprien" | Gérald Cyprien Lacroix 
| 
| style="text-align:center" | 

|- id="San Giuseppe da Copertino"
| scope="row" data-sort-value="Giuseppe da Copertino" | San Giuseppe da Copertino
| data-sort-value="Giuliano-Dalmata" | 
| data-sort-value="Lacunza Maestrojuan, Jose Luis" | José Luis Lacunza Maestrojuán 
| 
| style="text-align:center" | 

|- id="San Giustino"
| scope="row" data-sort-value="Giustino" | San Giustino
| data-sort-value="Alessandrino" | 
| data-sort-value="Pham, Jean-Baptiste, Minh Man" | Jean-Baptiste Phạm Minh Mẫn
| 
| style="text-align:center" | 

|- id="Gran Madre di Dio"
| scope="row" data-sort-value="Gran Madre di Dio" | Gran Madre di Dio
| data-sort-value="Della Vittoria" | 
| data-sort-value="Bagnasco, Angelo" | Angelo Bagnasco
| 
| style="text-align:center" | 

|- id="San Gregorio VII"
| scope="row" data-sort-value="Gregorio 07" | San Gregorio VII
| data-sort-value="Aurelio" | 
| data-sort-value="Thottunkal, Baselios Cleemis" | Baselios Cleemis Thottunkal
| 
| style="text-align:center" | 

|- id="San Gregorio Barbarigo alle Tre Fontane"
| scope="row" data-sort-value="Gregorio Barbarigo alle Tre Fontane" | San Gregorio Barbarigo alle Tre Fontane
| data-sort-value="Europa" | 
| data-sort-value="Tsarahazana, Desire" | Désiré Tsarahazana
| 
| style="text-align:center" | 

|- id="San Gregorio Magno alla Magliana Nuova"
| scope="row" data-sort-value="Gregorio Magno alla Magliana Nuova" | San Gregorio Magno alla Magliana Nuova
| data-sort-value="Portuense" | 
| data-sort-value="Agnelo, Geraldo Majella" | Geraldo Majella Agnelo
| 
| style="text-align:center" | 

|- id="Immacolata al Tiburtino"
| scope="row" data-sort-value="Immacolata al Tiburtino" | Immacolata al Tiburtino
| data-sort-value="Tiburtino" | 
| data-sort-value="Assis, Raymundo Damasceno" | Raymundo Damasceno Assis
| 
| style="text-align:center" | 

|- id="Immacolata Concezione di Maria a Grottarossa"
| scope="row" data-sort-value="Immacolata Concezione di Maria a Grottarossa" | Immacolata Concezione di Maria a Grottarossa
| data-sort-value="Grottarossa" | 
| data-sort-value="Gregory, Wilton Daniel" | Wilton Daniel Gregory
| 
| style="text-align:center" | 

|- id="Sant'Ippolito"
| scope="row" data-sort-value="Ippolito" | Sant'Ippolito
| data-sort-value="Nomentano" | 
| data-sort-value="Dew, John Atcherley" | John Atcherley Dew
| 
| style="text-align:center" | 

|- id="Sant'Ireneo a Centocelle"
| scope="row" data-sort-value="Ireneo a Centocelle" | Sant'Ireneo a Centocelle
| data-sort-value="Prenestino-Centocelle" | 
| data-sort-value="Bo, Charles Maung" | Charles Maung Bo 
| 
| style="text-align:center" | 

|- id="San Leonardo da Porto Maurizio ad Acilia"
| scope="row" data-sort-value="Leonardo da Porto Maurizio ad Acilia" | San Leonardo da Porto Maurizio ad Acilia
| data-sort-value="Acilia Sud" | 
| data-sort-value="Steiner, Leonardo Ulrich" | Leonardo Ulrich Steiner 
| 
| style="text-align:center" | 

|- id="San Leone I"
| scope="row" data-sort-value="Leone 1" | San Leone I
| data-sort-value="Prenestino-Labicano" | 
| data-sort-value="Lopez Romero, Cristobal" | Cristóbal López Romero 
| 
| style="text-align:center" | 

|- id="San Liborio"
| scope="row" data-sort-value="Liborio" | San Liborio
| data-sort-value="Monte Sacro Alto" | 
| data-sort-value="Turkson, Peter Kodwo Appiah" | Peter Kodwo Appiah Turkson
| 
| style="text-align:center" | 

|- id="San Lorenzo in Damaso"
| scope="row" data-sort-value="Lorenzo in Damaso" | San Lorenzo in Damaso (basilica)
| data-sort-value="Parione" | 
| data-sort-value="Rouco Varela, Antonio Maria" | Antonio María Rouco Varela
| 
| style="text-align:center" | 

|- id="San Lorenzo in Lucina"
| scope="row" data-sort-value="Lorenzo in Lucina" | San Lorenzo in Lucina (basilica)
| data-sort-value="Colonna" | 
| data-sort-value="Patabendige Don, Albert Malcolm Ranjith" | Albert Malcolm Ranjith Patabendige Don
| 
| style="text-align:center" | 

|- id="San Lorenzo in Panisperna"
| scope="row" data-sort-value="Lorenzo in Panisperna" | San Lorenzo in Panisperna
| data-sort-value="Monti" | 
| data-sort-value="Kitbunchu, Michael Michai" | Michael Michai Kitbunchu
| 
| style="text-align:center" | 

|- id="San Luca a Via Prenestina" style="background:#ccc"
| scope="row" data-sort-value="Luca a Via Prenestina" | San Luca a Via Prenestina 
| data-sort-value="Prenestino-Labicano" | 
| data-sort-value="Vacant" | Vacant 
| 
| style="text-align:center" | 

|- id="Santa Lucia a Piazza d'Armi"
| scope="row" data-sort-value="Lucia a Piazza d'Armi" | Santa Lucia a Piazza d'Armi
| data-sort-value="Della Vittoria" | 
| data-sort-value="Sarr, Theodore-Adrien" | Théodore-Adrien Sarr
| 
| style="text-align:center" | 

|- id="San Luigi dei Francesi"
| scope="row" data-sort-value="Luigi dei Francesi" | San Luigi dei Francesi
| data-sort-value="Sant'Eustachio" | 
| data-sort-value="Vingt-Trois, Andre" | André Vingt-Trois
| 
| style="text-align:center" | 

|- id="San Luigi Maria Grignion de Montfort"
| scope="row" data-sort-value="Luigi Maria Grignion de Montfort" | San Luigi Maria Grignion de Montfort
| data-sort-value="Primavalle" | 
| data-sort-value="Arizmendi Esquivel, Felipe" | Felipe Arizmendi Esquivel
| 
| style="text-align:center" | 

|- id="Santi Marcelino e Pietro"
| scope="row" data-sort-value="Marcellino e Pietro" | Santi Marcellino e Pietro
| data-sort-value="Monti" | 
| data-sort-value="Duka, Dominik" | Dominik Duka 
| 
| style="text-align:center" | 

|- id="San Marcello"
| scope="row" data-sort-value="Marcello" | San Marcello
| data-sort-value="Trevi" | 
| data-sort-value="Betori, Giuseppe" | Giuseppe Betori
| 
| style="text-align:center" | 

|- id="San Marco"
| scope="row" data-sort-value="Marco" | San Marco (basilica)
| data-sort-value="Pigna" | 
| data-sort-value="De Donatis, Angelo" | Angelo De Donatis
| 
| style="text-align:center" | 

|- id="San Marco in Agro Laurentino"
| scope="row" data-sort-value="Marco in Agro Laurentino" | San Marco in Agro Laurentino
| data-sort-value="Giuliano-Dalmata" | 
| data-sort-value="do Nascimento, Alexandre" | Alexandre do Nascimento
| 
| style="text-align:center" | 

|- id="Santa Maria Addolorata"
| scope="row" data-sort-value="Maria Addolorata" | Santa Maria Addolorata
| data-sort-value="Collatino" | 
| data-sort-value="Kovithavanij, Francis Xavier Kriengsak" | Francis Xavier Kriengsak Kovithavanij
| 
| style="text-align:center" | 

|- id="Santa Maria ai Monti"
| scope="row" data-sort-value="Maria ai Monti" | Santa Maria ai Monti
| data-sort-value="Monti" | 
| data-sort-value="Aveline, Jean-Marc" | Jean-Marc Aveline
| 
| style="text-align:center" | 

|- id="Santa Maria Consolatrice al Tiburtino"
| scope="row" data-sort-value="Maria Consolatrice al Tiburtino" | Santa Maria Consolatrice al Tiburtino
| data-sort-value="Tiburtino" | 
| data-sort-value="Ouedraogo, Philippe Nakellentuba" | Philippe Nakellentuba Ouédraogo
| 
| style="text-align:center" | 

|- id="Santa Maria degli Angeli"
| scope="row" data-sort-value="Maria degli Angeli" | Santa Maria degli Angeli (basilica)
| data-sort-value="Castro Pretorio" | 
| data-sort-value="Arborelius, Anders" | Anders Arborelius 
| 
| style="text-align:center" | 

|- id="Santa Maria del Buon Consiglio"
| scope="row" data-sort-value="Maria del Buon Consiglio" | Santa Maria del Buon Consiglio
| data-sort-value="Tuscolano" | 
| data-sort-value="Lojudice, Augusto Paolo" | Augusto Paolo Lojudice
| 
| style="text-align:center" | 

|- id="Santa Maria del Popolo"
| scope="row" data-sort-value="Maria del Popolo" | Santa Maria del Popolo (basilica)
| data-sort-value="Campo Marzio" | 
| data-sort-value="Dziwisz, Stanislaw" | Stanisław Dziwisz
| 
| style="text-align:center" | 

|- id="Santa Maria della Pace"
| scope="row" data-sort-value="Maria della Pace" | Santa Maria della Pace
| data-sort-value="Ponte" | 
| data-sort-value="Errazuriz Ossa, Francisco Javier" | Francisco Javier Errázuriz Ossa 
| 
| style="text-align:center" | 

|- id="Santa Maria della Presentazione"
| scope="row" data-sort-value="Maria della Presentazione" | Santa Maria della Presentazione
| data-sort-value="Trionfale" | 
| data-sort-value="Robles Ortega, Francisco" | Francisco Robles Ortega
| 
| style="text-align:center" | 

|- id="Santa Maria della Salute a Primavalle"
| scope="row" data-sort-value="Maria della Salute a Primavalle" | Santa Maria della Salute a Primavalle
| data-sort-value="Primavalle" | 
| data-sort-value="Felix, Kelvin Edward" | Kelvin Edward Felix
| 
| style="text-align:center" | 

|- id="Santa Maria della Speranza"
| scope="row" data-sort-value="Maria della Speranza" | Santa Maria della Speranza
| data-sort-value="Val Melaina" | 
| data-sort-value="Rodriguez Maradiaga, Oscar Andres" | Óscar Andrés Rodríguez Maradiaga 
| 
| style="text-align:center" | 

|- id="Santa Maria della Vittoria"
| scope="row" data-sort-value="Maria della Vittoria" | Santa Maria della Vittoria
| data-sort-value="Sallustiano" | 
| data-sort-value="OMalley, Sean Patrick" | Seán Patrick O'Malley 
| 
| style="text-align:center" | 

|- id="Santa Maria delle Grazie a Via Trionfale"
| scope="row" data-sort-value="Maria delle Grazie a Via Trionfale" | Santa Maria delle Grazie a Via Trionfale
| data-sort-value="Trionfale" | 
| data-sort-value="Tobin, Joseph William" | Joseph William Tobin 
| 
| style="text-align:center" | 

|- id="Santa Maria Domenica Mazzarello" style="background:#ccc"
| scope="row" data-sort-value="Maria Domenica Mazzarello" | Santa Maria Domenica Mazzarello 
| data-sort-value="Don Bosco" | 
| data-sort-value="Vacant" | Vacant 
| 
| style="text-align:center" | 

|- id="Santa Maria Immacolata di Lourdes a Boccea" style="background:#ccc"
| scope="row" data-sort-value="Maria Immacolata di Lourdes a Boccea" | Santa Maria Immacolata di Lourdes a Boccea 
| data-sort-value="Aurelio" | 
| data-sort-value="Vacant" | Vacant 
| | style="text-align:center" | 

|- id="Santa Maria in Ara Coeli"
| scope="row" data-sort-value="Maria in Ara Coeli" | Santa Maria in Ara Coeli (basilica)
| data-sort-value="Campitelli" | 
| data-sort-value="De Giorgi, Salvatore" | Salvatore De Giorgi
| 
| style="text-align:center" | 

|- id="Santa Maria in Monserrato degli Spagnoli" style="background:#ccc"
| scope="row" data-sort-value="Maria in Monserrato degli Spagnoli" | Santa Maria in Monserrato degli Spagnoli 
| data-sort-value="Regola" | 
| data-sort-value="Vacant" | Vacant 
| | style="text-align:center" | 

|- id="Santa Maria in Traspontina"
| scope="row" data-sort-value="Maria in Traspontina" | Santa Maria in Traspontina, suburbicarian rank 
| data-sort-value="Borgo" | 
| data-sort-value="Ouellet, Marc" | Marc Ouellet 
| 
| style="text-align:center" | 

|- id="Santa Maria in Trastevere"
| scope="row" data-sort-value="Maria in Trastevere" | Santa Maria in Trastevere (basilica)
| data-sort-value="Trastevere" | 
| data-sort-value="Osoro Sierra, Carlos" | Carlos Osoro Sierra
| 
| style="text-align:center" | 

|- id="Santa Maria in Vallicella"
| scope="row" data-sort-value="Maria in Vallicella" | Santa Maria in Vallicella
| data-sort-value="Parione" | 
| data-sort-value="Blazquez Perez, Ricardo" | Ricardo Blázquez Pérez
| 
| style="text-align:center" | 

|- id="Santa Maria in Via"
| scope="row" data-sort-value="Maria in Via" | Santa Maria in Via
| data-sort-value="Trevi" | 
| data-sort-value="do Rosario Ferrao, Filipe Neri Antonio Sebastiao" | Filipe Neri António Sebastião do Rosário Ferrão
| 
| style="text-align:center" | 

|- id="Santa Maria Madre del Redentore a Tor Bella Monaca"
| scope="row" data-sort-value="Maria Madre del Redentore a Tor Bella Monaca" | Santa Maria Madre del Redentore a Tor Bella Monaca
| data-sort-value="Torre Angela" | 
| data-sort-value="Zen, Joseph, Ze-kiun" | Joseph Zen Ze-kiun 
| 
| style="text-align:center" | 

|- id="Santa Maria Madre della Provvidenza a Monte Verde"
| scope="row" data-sort-value="Maria Madre della Provvidenza a Monte Verde" | Santa Maria Madre della Provvidenza a Monte Verde
| data-sort-value="Gianicolense" | 
| data-sort-value="Tempesta, Orani Joao" | Orani João Tempesta 
| 
| style="text-align:center" | 

|- id="Santa Maria Nuova" style="background:#ccc"
| scope="row" data-sort-value="Maria Nuova" | Santa Maria Nuova (basilica) 
| data-sort-value="Campitelli" | 
| data-sort-value="Vacant" | Vacant 
| | style="text-align:center" | 

|- id="Santa Maria Regina Mundi a Torre Spaccata"
| scope="row" data-sort-value="Maria Regina Mundi a Torre Spaccata" | Santa Maria Regina Mundi a Torre Spaccata
| data-sort-value="Don Bosco" | 
| data-sort-value="Quevedo, Orlando Beltran" | Orlando Beltran Quevedo 
| 
| style="text-align:center" | 

|- id="Santa Maria Regina Pacis a Monte Verde"
| scope="row" data-sort-value="Maria Regina Pacis a Monte Verde" | Santa Maria Regina Pacis a Monte Verde
| data-sort-value="Gianicolense" | 
| data-sort-value="Cantoni, Oscar" | Oscar Cantoni
| 
| style="text-align:center" | 

|- id="Santa Maria Regina Pacis in Ostia mare"
| scope="row" data-sort-value="Maria Regina Pacis in Ostia mare" | Santa Maria Regina Pacis in Ostia mare
| data-sort-value="Lido di Ostia Levante" | 
| data-sort-value="Goh, William, Seng Chye" | William Goh Seng Chye
| 
| style="text-align:center" | 

|- id="Santa Maria sopra Minerva"
| scope="row" data-sort-value="Maria sopra Minerva" | Santa Maria sopra Minerva (basilica)
| data-sort-value="Pigna" | 
| data-sort-value="dos Santos Marto, Antonio Augusto" | António Augusto dos Santos Marto
| 
| style="text-align:center" | 

|- id="Santi Martiri dell'Uganda a Poggio Ameno"
| scope="row" data-sort-value="Martiri dell'Uganda a Poggio Ameno" | Santi Martiri dell'Uganda a Poggio Ameno
| data-sort-value="Ardeatino" | 
| data-sort-value="Okpaleke, Peter Ebere" | Peter Ebere Okpaleke
| 
| style="text-align:center" | 

|- id="Natività di Nostro Signore Gesù Cristo a Via Gallia"
| scope="row" data-sort-value="Nativita di Nostro Signore Gesu Cristo a Via Gallia" | Natività di Nostro Signore Gesù Cristo a Via Gallia
| data-sort-value="Appio-Latino" | 
| data-sort-value="Backis, Audrys Juozas" | Audrys Juozas Bačkis
| 
| style="text-align:center" | 

|- id="Santi Nereo ed Achilleo"
| scope="row" data-sort-value="Nereo ed Achilleo" | Santi Nereo ed Achilleo
| data-sort-value="San Saba" | 
| data-sort-value="Aos Braco, Celestino" | Celestino Aós Braco 
| 
| style="text-align:center" | 

|- id="Santissimo Nome di Maria in Via Latina"
| scope="row" data-sort-value="Nome di Maria in Via Latina" | Santissimo Nome di Maria in Via Latina
| data-sort-value="Appio-Latino" | 
| data-sort-value="Rosales, Gaudencio Borbon" | Gaudencio Borbon Rosales
| 
| style="text-align:center" | 

|- id="Nostra Signora de La Salette"
| scope="row" data-sort-value="Nostra Signora de La Salette" | Nostra Signora de La Salette
| data-sort-value="Gianicolense" | 
| data-sort-value="Pengo, Polycarp" | Polycarp Pengo
| 
| style="text-align:center" | 

|- id="Nostra Signora del Santissimo Sacramento e Santi Martiri Canadesi"
| scope="row" data-sort-value="Nostra Signora del Santissimo Sacramento e Santi Martiri Canadesi" | Nostra Signora del Santissimo Sacramento e Santi Martiri Canadesi
| data-sort-value="Nomentano" | 
| data-sort-value="DRozario, Patrick" | Patrick D'Rozario 
| 
| style="text-align:center" | 

|- id="Nostra Signora di Guadalupe a Monte Mario"
| scope="row" data-sort-value="Nostra Signora di Guadalupe a Monte Mario" | Nostra Signora di Guadalupe a Monte Mario
| data-sort-value="Della Vittoria" | 
| data-sort-value="Dolan, Timothy Michael" | Timothy Michael Dolan
| 
| style="text-align:center" | 

|- id="Nostra Signora di Guadalupe e San Filippo Martire"
| scope="row" data-sort-value="Nostra Signora di Guadalupe e Filippo Martire" | Nostra Signora di Guadalupe e San Filippo Martire (basilica)
| data-sort-value="Aurelio" | 
| data-sort-value="Sandoval Iniguez, Juan" | Juan Sandoval Íñiguez
| 
| style="text-align:center" | 

|- id="Sant'Onofrio" style="background:#ccc"
| scope="row" data-sort-value="Onofrio" | Sant'Onofrio 
| data-sort-value="Trastevere" | 
| data-sort-value="Vacant" | Vacant 
| | style="text-align:center" | 

|- id="San Pancrazio"
| scope="row" data-sort-value="Pancrazio" | San Pancrazio (basilica)
| data-sort-value="Gianicolense" | 
| data-sort-value="Canizares Llovera, Antonio" | Antonio Cañizares Llovera
| 
| style="text-align:center" | 

|- id="Santa Paola Romana"
| scope="row" data-sort-value="Paola Romana" | Santa Paola Romana
| data-sort-value="Trionfale" | 
| data-sort-value="Mafi, Soane Patita Paini" | Soane Patita Paini Mafi
| 
| style="text-align:center" | 

|- id="San Paolo della Croce a Corviale"
| scope="row" data-sort-value="Paolo della Croce a Corviale" | San Paolo della Croce a Corviale
| data-sort-value="Gianicolense" | 
| data-sort-value="Gracias, Oswald" | Oswald Gracias
| 
| style="text-align:center" | 

|- id="San Patrizio"
| scope="row" data-sort-value="Patrizio" | San Patrizio
| data-sort-value="Ludovisi" | 
| data-sort-value="Collins, Thomas Christopher" | Thomas Christopher Collins
| 
| style="text-align:center" | 

|- id="Santi Pietro e Paolo a Via Ostiense"
| scope="row" data-sort-value="Pietro e Paolo a Via Ostiense" | Santi Pietro e Paolo a Via Ostiense (basilica)
| data-sort-value="Europa" | 
| data-sort-value="Barreto Jimeno, Pedro Ricardo" | Pedro Ricardo Barreto Jimeno 
| 
| style="text-align:center" | 

|- id="San Pietro in Montorio"
| scope="row" data-sort-value="Pietro in Montorio" | San Pietro in Montorio
| data-sort-value="Trastevere" | 
| data-sort-value="Stafford, James Francis" | James Francis Stafford
| 
| style="text-align:center" | 

|- id="San Pietro in Vincoli"
| scope="row" data-sort-value="Pietro in Vincoli" | San Pietro in Vincoli (basilica)
| data-sort-value="Monti" | 
| data-sort-value="Wuerl, Donald William" | Donald William Wuerl
| 
| style="text-align:center" | 

|- id="San Pio X alla Balduina"
| scope="row" data-sort-value="Pio 10 alla Balduina" | San Pio X alla Balduina 
| data-sort-value="Trionfale" | 
| data-sort-value="Lopez Rodriguez, Nicolas de Jesus" | Nicolás de Jesús López Rodríguez
| 
| style="text-align:center" | 

|- id="San Policarpo"
| scope="row" data-sort-value="Policarpo" | San Policarpo
| data-sort-value="Appio-Claudio" | 
| data-sort-value="Suarez Inda, Alberto" | Alberto Suárez Inda
| 
| style="text-align:center" | 

|- id="Santa Prassede"
| scope="row" data-sort-value="Prassede" | Santa Prassede (basilica)
| data-sort-value="Monti" | 
| data-sort-value="Poupard, Paul" | Paul Poupard
| 
| style="text-align:center" | 

|- id="Preziosissimo Sangue di Nostro Signore Gesù Cristo"
| scope="row" data-sort-value="Preziosissimo Sangue di Nostro Signore Gesu Cristo" | Preziosissimo Sangue di Nostro Signore Gesù Cristo
| data-sort-value="Tor di Quinto" | 
| data-sort-value="Njue, John" | John Njue
| 
| style="text-align:center" | 

|- id="Santa Prisca"
| scope="row" data-sort-value="Prisca" | Santa Prisca
| data-sort-value="Ripa" | 
| data-sort-value="Rigali, Justin Francis" | Justin Francis Rigali
| 
| style="text-align:center" | 

|- id="Santi Protomartiri a Via Aurelia Antica"
| scope="row" data-sort-value="Protomartiri a Via Aurelia Antica" | Santi Protomartiri a Via Aurelia Antica
| data-sort-value="Aurelio" | 
| data-sort-value="Poola, Anthony" | Anthony Poola
| 
| style="text-align:center" | 

|- id="Santa Pudenziana"
| scope="row" data-sort-value="Pudenziana" | Santa Pudenziana (basilica)
| data-sort-value="Monti" | 
| data-sort-value="Manyo Maeda, Thomas Aquino" | Thomas Aquino Manyo Maeda
| 
| style="text-align:center" | 

|- id="Santi Quattro Coronati"
| scope="row" data-sort-value="Quattro Coronati" | Santi Quattro Coronati (basilica)
| data-sort-value="Celio" | 
| data-sort-value="Mahony, Roger Michael" | Roger Michael Mahony
| 
| style="text-align:center" | 

|- id="Santi Quirico e Giulitta"
| scope="row" data-sort-value="Quirico e Giulitta" | Santi Quirico e Giulitta
| data-sort-value="Monti" | 
| data-sort-value="Brady, Sean Baptist" | Seán Baptist Brady
| 
| style="text-align:center" | 

|- id="Santissimo Redentore a Valmelaina"
| scope="row" data-sort-value="Redentore a Valmelaina" | Santissimo Redentore a Valmelaina
| data-sort-value="Monte Sacro" | 
| data-sort-value="Ezzati Andrello, Ricardo" | Ricardo Ezzati Andrello 
| 
| style="text-align:center" | 

|- id="Santissimo Redentore e Sant'Alfonso in Via Merulana"
| scope="row" data-sort-value="Redentore e Alfonso in Via Merulana" | Santissimo Redentore e Sant'Alfonso in Via Merulana
| data-sort-value="Esquilino" | 
| data-sort-value="Nichols, Vincent Gerard" | Vincent Gerard Nichols
| 
| style="text-align:center" | 

|- id="Regina Apostolorum"
| scope="row" data-sort-value="Regina Apostolorum" | Regina Apostolorum (basilica)
| data-sort-value="Ostiense" | 
| data-sort-value="Tong, John, Hon" | John Tong Hon
| 
| style="text-align:center" | 

|- id="San Roberto Bellarmino"
| scope="row" data-sort-value="Roberto Bellarmino" | San Roberto Bellarmino
| data-sort-value="Parioli" | 
| data-sort-value="Poli, Mario Aurelio" | Mario Aurelio Poli
| 
| style="text-align:center" | 

|- id="San Romano Martire"
| scope="row" data-sort-value="Romano Martire" | San Romano Martire
| data-sort-value="Pietralata" | 
| data-sort-value="Souraphiel, Berhaneyesus Demerew" | Berhaneyesus Demerew Souraphiel 
| 
| style="text-align:center" | 

|- id="Santa Sabina" style="background:#ccc"
| scope="row" data-sort-value="Sabina" | Santa Sabina (basilica) 
| data-sort-value="Ripa" | 
| data-sort-value="Vacant" | Vacant 
| | style="text-align:center" | 

|- id="Santissimo Sacramento a Tor de' Schiavi"
| scope="row" data-sort-value="Sacramento a Tor de' Schiavi" | Santissimo Sacramento a Tor de' Schiavi 
| data-sort-value="Prenestino-Labicano" | 
| data-sort-value="Rosa Chavez, Gregorio" | Gregorio Rosa Chávez
| 
| style="text-align:center" | 

|- id="San Saturnino"
| scope="row" data-sort-value="Saturnino" |San Saturnino
| data-sort-value="Trieste" | 
| data-sort-value="Onaiyekan, John Olorunfemi" | John Olorunfemi Onaiyekan
| 
| style="text-align:center" | 

|- id="San Sebastiano alle Catacombe"
| scope="row" data-sort-value="Sebastiano alle Catacombe" | San Sebastiano alle Catacombe (basilica)
| data-sort-value="Ardeatino" | 
| data-sort-value="Martinez Sistach, Lluis" | Lluís Martínez Sistach
| 
| style="text-align:center" | 

|- id="San Silvestro e Martino ai Monti"
| scope="row" data-sort-value="Silvestro e Martino ai Monti" | Santi Silvestro e Martino ai Monti (basilica)
| data-sort-value="Monti" | 
| data-sort-value="Nycz, Kazimierz" | Kazimierz Nycz
| 
| style="text-align:center" | 

|- id="San Silvestro in Capite"
| scope="row" data-sort-value="Silvestro in Capite" | San Silvestro in Capite
| data-sort-value="Colonna" | 
| data-sort-value="Mangkhanekhoun, Louis-Marie Ling" | Louis-Marie Ling Mangkhanekhoun 
| 
| style="text-align:center" | 

|- id="Santa Silvia"
| scope="row" data-sort-value="Silvia" | Santa Silvia
| data-sort-value="Portuense" | 
| data-sort-value="Pujats, Janis" | Jānis Pujats
| 
| style="text-align:center" | 

|- id="Santi Simone e Giuda Taddeo a Torre Angela"
| scope="row" data-sort-value="Simone e Giuda Taddeo a Torre Angela" | Santi Simone e Giuda Taddeo a Torre Angela, suburbicarian rank 
| data-sort-value="Torre Angela" | 
| data-sort-value="Parolin, Pietro" | Pietro Parolin
| 
| style="text-align:center" | 

|- id="San Sisto"
| scope="row" data-sort-value="Sisto" | San Sisto (basilica)
| data-sort-value="Celio" | 
| data-sort-value="Kambanda, Antoine" | Antoine Kambanda
| 
| style="text-align:center" | 

|- id="Santa Sofia a Via Boccea" style="background:#ccc"
| scope="row" data-sort-value="Sofia a Via Boccea" | Santa Sofia a Via Boccea (basilica) 
| data-sort-value="Trionfale" | 
| data-sort-value="Vacant" | Vacant 
| | style="text-align:center" | 

|- id="Spirito Santo alla Ferratella"
| scope="row" data-sort-value="Spirito Santo alla Ferratella" | Spirito Santo alla Ferratella
| data-sort-value="Fonte Ostiense" | 
| data-sort-value="Suharyo Hardjoatmodjo, Ignatius" | Ignatius Suharyo Hardjoatmodjo
| 
| style="text-align:center" | 

|- id="Santo Stefano al Monte Celio"
| scope="row" data-sort-value="Stefano al Monte Celio" | Santo Stefano al Monte Celio (basilica)
| data-sort-value="Monti" | 
| data-sort-value="Wetter, Friedrich" | Friedrich Wetter
| 
| style="text-align:center" | 

|- id="Santa Susanna" style="background:#ccc"
| scope="row" data-sort-value="Susanna" | Santa Susanna 
| data-sort-value="Trevi" | 
| data-sort-value="Vacant" | Vacant 
| | style="text-align:center" | 

|- id="Santa Teresa al Corso d'Italia"
| scope="row" data-sort-value="Teresa al Corso d'Italia" | Santa Teresa al Corso d'Italia (basilica)
| data-sort-value="Pinciano" | 
| data-sort-value="Piat, Maurice" | Maurice Piat 
| 
| style="text-align:center" | 

|- id="San Timoteo"
| scope="row" data-sort-value="Timoteo" | San Timoteo
| data-sort-value="Casal Palocco" | 
| data-sort-value="Gomes Furtado, Arlindo" | Arlindo Gomes Furtado
| 
| style="text-align:center" | 

|- id="San Tommaso Apostolo"
| scope="row" data-sort-value="Tommaso Apostolo" | San Tommaso Apostolo
| data-sort-value="Castel Fusano" | 
| data-sort-value="Nguyen, Pierre, Van Nhon" | Pierre Nguyễn Văn Nhơn
| 
| style="text-align:center" | 

|- id="Trasfigurazione di Nostro Signore Gesù Cristo"
| scope="row" data-sort-value="Trasfigurazione di Nostro Signore Gesu Cristo" | Trasfigurazione di Nostro Signore Gesù Cristo
| data-sort-value="Gianicolense" | 
| data-sort-value="Rubiano Saenz, Pedro" | Pedro Rubiano Sáenz
| 
| style="text-align:center" | 

|- id="Santissima Trinità al Monte Pincio"
| scope="row" data-sort-value="Trinita al Monte Pincio" | Santissima Trinità al Monte Pincio
| data-sort-value="Campo Marzio" | 
| data-sort-value="Barbarin, Philippe" | Philippe Barbarin
| 
| style="text-align:center" | 

|- id="Sant'Ugo"
| scope="row" data-sort-value="Ugo" | Sant'Ugo
| data-sort-value="Val Melaina" | 
| data-sort-value="Wamala, Emmanuel" | Emmanuel Wamala
| 
| style="text-align:center" | 

|- id="San Vigilio"
| scope="row" data-sort-value="Vigilio" | San Vigilio
| data-sort-value="Ardeatino" | 
| data-sort-value="Advincula, Jose Fuerte" | Jose Fuerte Advincula
| 
| style="text-align:center" | 

|- id="Santi Vitale, Valeria, Gervasio e Protasio"
| scope="row" data-sort-value="Vitale, Valeria, Gervasio e Protasio" | Santi Vitale, Valeria, Gervasio e Protasio (basilica)
| data-sort-value="Monti" | 
| data-sort-value="Maida, Adam Joseph" | Adam Joseph Maida
| 
| style="text-align:center" | 

|-
|}

 Deaconries 
 there are 69 deaconries, 10 of which are vacant.

 Suburbicarian dioceses 

There are seven suburbicarian dioceses, situated in the vicinity of Rome, the titles of which are assigned to the six cardinal bishops (excluding additional cardinals who have been co-opted into the order, and cardinal bishops who are Eastern Catholic patriarchs). These do not form part of the Diocese of Rome, but are separate suffragan dioceses within its ecclesiastical province, with territory generally lying outside the city's boundaries. Suburbicarian dioceses are not strictly titular churches, but are similar in function, serving as honorary assignments for cardinals signifying their relationship with the pope.

Since 1914, the title of Ostia has been assigned ex officio'' to the dean of the College of Cardinals, in addition to that of his first suburbicarian diocese when originally appointed a cardinal bishop. Patriarchs of Eastern Catholic Churches who are created cardinal bishops are not assigned suburbicarian dioceses; their respective patriarchates are considered to be their titles.

 one title of a suburbicarian diocese is vacant.

See also 
 List of current cardinals
 Churches of Rome
 National churches in Rome

Notes

References

External links 

 GCatholic.org, Suburbicarian Sees, Cardinal Titles, Cardinal Deaconries
 Catholic-Hierarchy, Cardinal Titular Titles
 The Cardinals of the Holy Roman Church, Suburbicarian Sees, Titles, Deaconries
 Diocesi di Roma, Enti

 
+
Lists of churches in Italy
Rome-related lists
Lists of Roman Catholic churches